R. Girirajan is an  Indian politician and a member of the Rajya Sabha, upper house of the Parliament of India from Tamil Nadu as a member of the Dravida Munnetra Kazhagam.

References

Dravida Munnetra Kazhagam politicians

Living people
Year of birth missing (living people)